Achuli is a village in Purushottampur block, Ganjam District, Odisha, India. Its village code is 118336. It is one of the 25 villages that fall under the Purushottampur block. Achuli is located 3.4 km from Purushottampur, 20.9 km from Chatrapur, and 129 km from Bhubaneswar.

This village has a fairly small population of 1357 persons, 683 males and 674 females. Achuli has a state-run primary school that accommodates pupils ages 5 to 10 (class 1st to 5th). The local elections are held in Khalikote (SC) Assembly Constituency (Aska Loksabha, Orissa).

Demographics
The population of Achuli is predominantly Hindu. The village counts 601 scheduled castes, 7 from scheduled tribe while 749 are from the general category.

Central government schemes
Under the Mahatma Gandhi National Rural Employment Guarantee Act  10 lakhs have been sanctioned to the village Gram Panchayat for construction projects in and around the village.

Nearby tourist places
Taratarini Temple is approximately 4 km from the village, on the way to Brahmapur. The twin goddesses Tara and Tarini are worshiped as manifestations of Adi Shakti. The Taratarini Hill Shrine is one of the oldest pilgrimage centers of Mother Goddess and is one amongst four major ancient Shakti Peethas in India. Another shaktipeeth named goddess Dakhinkali situates at Pratapur which is three km from Achhuli. It is also a wonderful tourist spot. The best time to visit is from October to February.

References

Villages in Ganjam district achuli gram panchayat contains 5 village like Gothiali,Achuli,Mendhapalli,Chadheya palli,Hindala Palli